Laura Rachel Stacey (born May 5, 1994) is a Canadian ice hockey player, currently affiliated with the Montreal chapter of the Professional Women's Hockey Players Association (PWHPA) and a member of the Canadian women's national ice hockey team. She previously played with the Markham Thunder and the Dartmouth Big Green and competed internationally with the Canadian women's national under-18 and under-22 teams. She won a silver medal with Team Canada at the 2018 Winter Olympics.

Playing career
She represented Team Ontario at the 2011 Canada Winter Games. During the 2011–12 Canada women's national ice hockey team season, she was a member of the Canadian National Under 18 team that participated in a three-game series vs. the US in August 2011. She scored a goal in the gold medal game of the 2011 Canadian National Women's Under-18 Championships for Team Ontario Red. In the first game of the 2012 IIHF World Women's U18 Championship (contested on December 31, 2011), Laura Stacey accumulated three points in a 13–1 rout of Switzerland.

Stacey played for Team Canada at the 2018 Winter Olympics, playing in five games and earning a silver medal. On January 11, 2022, Stacey was named to Canada's 2022 Olympic team.

NCAA
On January 23, 2012, it was announced that Stacey committed to the Dartmouth Big Green. In her first season, she was named to the ECAC Hockey All-Rookie Team and was one of three finalists for the ECAC Rookie of the Year. As a junior, she earned All-Ivy Honorable Mention. In her senior year (2015-16), she captained the Big Green and earned All-Ivy first-team honours.

CWHL
Stacey was selected third overall by the Brampton Thunder in the 2016 CWHL Draft. Making her CWHL debut in a road contest against the Calgary Inferno on October 8, 2016, she would log her first goal with the Thunder on October 9. An October 16 tilt with Les Canadiennes de Montreal resulted in the first multi-point performance of her CWHL career, as she recorded a pair of assists.

In her first season in the league, Stacey was named among the participants in the 3rd CWHL All-Star Game. Competing with Team White, she was joined by fellow Thunder teammates Laura Fortino, Jess Jones and Rebecca Vint. Stacey and Vint logged an assist on the ninth goal of the game, scored by Marie-Philip Poulin.

Appearing in the 2018 Clarkson Cup finals against the Kunlun Red Star, Stacey would score with 2:11 left in the 4-on-4 overtime, as Markham prevailed by a 2–1 tally for its first-ever Cup win.

Career statistics

Hockey Canada
In progress

NCAA

CWHL

Awards and honours
2011 Canada Winter games: Silver medal (with Team Ontario)

NCAA
2012-13: ECAC Hockey All-Rookie Team
2014-15: All-Ivy Honorable Mention 
2014-15: ECAC Hockey All-Academic
2015-16: Dartmouth Team Captain 
2015-16: All-Ivy First Team 
2015-16: Academic All-Ivy 
2015-16: ECAC Hockey Third Team All-League 
2015-16: ECAC Hockey All-Academic

CWHL
2018 Clarkson Cup champion

Personal
Stacey is the great-granddaughter of Hockey Hall of Famer King Clancy. Her great-uncle, Terry Clancy, played for Team Canada at the 1964 Winter Olympics in Innsbruck, Austria.

References

External links
 
 
 
 

1994 births
Brampton Thunder players
Canadian expatriate ice hockey players in the United States
Canadian women's ice hockey forwards
Clarkson Cup champions
Dartmouth Big Green women's ice hockey players
Ice hockey people from Ontario
Ice hockey players at the 2018 Winter Olympics
Ice hockey players at the 2022 Winter Olympics
Living people
Markham Thunder players
Medalists at the 2018 Winter Olympics
Medalists at the 2022 Winter Olympics
Olympic ice hockey players of Canada
Olympic medalists in ice hockey
Olympic gold medalists for Canada
Olympic silver medalists for Canada
Sportspeople from Mississauga
Professional Women's Hockey Players Association players